The 1991 New York Yankees season was the 89th season for the Yankees. The team finished with a record of 71-91 finishing 20 games behind the Toronto Blue Jays. New York was managed by Stump Merrill. The Yankees played at Yankee Stadium.

Offseason
October 5, 1990: Wayne Tolleson was released by the New York Yankees.
 November 19, 1990: Tim Leary was signed as a free agent with the New York Yankees.
 December 3, 1990: Frank Seminara was drafted by the San Diego Padres from the New York Yankees in the 1990 rule 5 draft.
 December 31, 1990: Scott Sanderson was purchased by the New York Yankees from the Oakland Athletics.
 January 13, 1991: Rick Cerone was released by the New York Yankees.
March 19, 1991: Torey Lovullo was traded by the Detroit Tigers to the New York Yankees for Mark Leiter.

Regular season
 Steve Sax led the Yankees with a .304 batting average, 198 hits, 85 runs, and 38 doubles.
 April 11, 1991 – Roberto Kelly had 5 RBI in a game versus the Detroit Tigers.
 June 23, 1991 – Roberto Kelly had 5 hits in a game versus the eventual World Champion Minnesota Twins.

Season standings

Record vs. opponents

Detailed records

Notable transactions
April 1, 1991: Steve Balboni was released by the New York Yankees.
April 5, 1991: Scott Lusader was selected off waivers by the New York Yankees from the Detroit Tigers.
May 9, 1991: Andy Hawkins was released by the New York Yankees.
May 17, 1991: Mike Blowers was traded by the New York Yankees to the Seattle Mariners for a player to be named later and cash. The Seattle Mariners sent Jim Blueberg (minors) (June 22, 1991) to the New York Yankees to complete the trade.
May 25, 1991: Andy Pettite was signed by the New York Yankees as an amateur free agent.

Draft picks
With the first overall pick in the MLB draft, the New York Yankees selected Brien Taylor. He was a left-handed pitcher from Beaufort, North Carolina who competed at East Carteret High School.
Notable Draft Picks

Roster

Player stats

Batting

Starters by position
Note: Pos = Position; G = Games played; AB = At bats; H = Hits; Avg. = Batting average; HR = Home runs; RBI = Runs batted in

Other batters
Note: G = Games played; AB = At bats; H = Hits; Avg.= Batting average; HR = Home runs; RBI = Runs batted in

Starting pitchers
Note: G = Games pitched; IP = Innings pitched; W = Wins; L = Losses; ERA = Earned run average; SO = Strikeouts

Other pitchers
Note: G = Games pitched; IP = Innings pitched; W = Wins; L = Losses; ERA = Earned run average; SO = Strikeouts

Relief pitchers
Note: G = Games pitched; W = Wins; L = Losses; SV = Saves; ERA = Earned run average; SO = Strikeouts

Farm system

LEAGUE CHAMPIONS: Columbus, Albany-Colonie

References

External links
1991 New York Yankees at Baseball Reference
1991 New York Yankees team page at www.baseball-almanac.com

New York Yankees seasons
New York Yankees
New York Yankees
1990s in the Bronx